Three PNC Plaza is a  tall skyscraper in Pittsburgh, Pennsylvania. It was announced on December 19, 2005 and completed in 2009 with 23 floors. It was the tallest building constructed in the city since Highmark Tower was completed in 1988, until The Tower at PNC Plaza was completed in 2015. It contains  of office space, a 185-room Fairmont Hotel, and 28 condominium units. The $179 million ($ in current dollars) project created 800 construction-related jobs with a $35 million payroll ($ in current dollars). Thirteen buildings were demolished to make way for the building.

Three PNC Plaza is a LEED certified green building. It is one of the nation's largest mixed use green buildings.

International law firm Reed Smith moved their corporate headquarters into the building.

See also
List of tallest buildings in Pittsburgh
Fairmont Hotels and Resorts

References

Residential condominiums in the United States
Residential skyscrapers in Pittsburgh
Skyscraper office buildings in Pittsburgh
Residential buildings completed in 2009
Leadership in Energy and Environmental Design gold certified buildings
Condo hotels in the United States
Skyscraper hotels in Pittsburgh